Drasteria antiqua is a moth of the family Erebidae. It is found in Kyrghyzstan and Mongolia.

References

Drasteria
Moths described in 1889
Moths of Asia